Underwood's long-tongued bat (Hylonycteris underwoodi) is a species of bat in the family Phyllostomidae. It is the only species within the genus Hylonycteris. It is found in Belize, Guatemala, Mexico, Nicaragua, and Panama. Hylonycteris underwoodi feed on nectar, pollen grains, agave and fruits. This choice of food has allowed them to gain the ability of hovering flight, thereby evolving their body mass and size to compensate for the same.

Taxonomy
It was described as a new species in 1903 by British mammalogist Oldfield Thomas. The holotype was collected by Cecil F. Underwood, who is the eponym for the species name "underwoodi".

References

Phyllostomidae
Bats of Central America
Bats of Mexico
Mammals described in 1903
Taxonomy articles created by Polbot
Taxa named by Oldfield Thomas